Nā Pali Coast State Park is a  state park in the U.S. state of Hawaii, located in the center of the rugged  northwest side of Kauai, the second-oldest inhabited Hawaiian island. The Nā Pali coast itself extends southwest from Kee Beach all the way to Polihale State Park. The state park was formed to protect the Kalalau Valley.

To the east of the state park is the Hono O Nā Pali State Natural Reserve. Hiking trails and hunters' roads provide access to the sharp ridges from Koke'e Road (route 550) in Waimea Canyon.

Accessibility
Although inaccessible to vehicles, this coast can be enjoyed over land by hiking or in a helicopter, and from the ocean by kayak and paddleboard. Charter tours are available on rigid-hulled inflatable boat or catamaran, originating from Port Allen and Hanalei Bay. The Kalalau Trail from the end of Hawaii Route 560 (called the Kuhio Highway) provides the only land access along the coast, traversing  and crossing five major valleys (and many smaller ones) before reaching Kalalau Beach at the base of Kalalau Valley. Side trails along the way lead to waterfalls in the valleys above.

History
The first settlers on the Nā Pali Coast were Polynesian navigators around 1200 AD. Soon after, many Tahitian migrants followed, shaping the culture of Kauai and other Hawaiian islands today.  The coast was a center for trade between Hanalei, Waimea and Ni`ihau, and branched out to nearby island colonies. After Kauai was visited by Captain Cook in 1778, many Westerners began traveling to the island. As more foreigners arrived, the Hawaiian tribes along the Nā Pali Coast, where Nā Pali Coast State Park now exists, began to die off from Western diseases. The last known native Hawaiians to live along the Nā Pali Coast were sighted in the 20th century.

Camping
Camping in Nā Pali Coast State Park is only allowed with a valid permit. There are three sites that allow camping access. During the summer season from May 15 to September 7, access from the ocean via boat or kayak is only allowed with a  valid camping permit. Along the Kalalau Trail, the two authorized spots for camping are in Kalalau and Hanakoa . Both are covered by the same permit and can be accessed by hiking. These locations include facilities to accommodate campers. Five nights is the maximum stay on the Kalalau Trail, and one night maximum for Hanakoa. The camp site at Miloli'i is only accessible by boat or kayak. Permits allow access for maximum of three days. Composting toilets are available at all three camp sites.

See also
 Natural Area Reserves System Hawaii
 Hanakapiai Beach
 Hanakapiai Falls
 Hanakoa Valley

References

External links
Nā Pali Coast Magazine
Nā Pali Coast Ohana
Nā Pali Hiking Tips
Nā Pali Coast Beach
Nā Pali Coast Hike - Kalalau
Nā Pali Coast Hike - Hanakapiaai
Overview of Nā Pali Coast. Pictures + Map
Nā Pali Guide
Koke'e & Nā Pali Coast Recreation Map for smartphones – GPS enabled map of Koke'e and Nā Pali coast trails

State parks of Hawaii
Beaches of Kauai
Protected areas of Kauai
Cliffs of Hawaii